An omnibus edition or omnibus is a creative work containing one or more works by the same or, more rarely, different authors. Commonly two or more components have been previously published as books but a collection of shorter works, or shorter works collected with one previous book, may be an omnibus.

Omnibus editions help consolidate longer series into fewer books. The prices are usually equal to or less than the price of buying each individual edition separately.

Examples
The Omnibus Jules Verne (4-Books-In-1: Twenty Thousand Leagues Under the Sea, Around the World in Eighty Days, The Blockade Runners, From the Earth to the Moon and a Trip Around It). Philadelphia: J. B. Lippincott & Co.
The Sherlock Holmes illustrated omnibus : a facsimile ed. of all Arthur Conan Doyle’s Sherlock Holmes stories, illustrated by Sidney Paget, as they originally appeared in the Strand magazine. London: John Murray. 1978.
Agatha Christie 1920s Omnibus, Agatha Christie 1930s Omnibus, and so on to the 1960s Omnibus, are five omnibus editions of those novels by Agatha Christie that were originally published in one decade.
 Marvel Comics, DC Comics and Image Comics have published omnibus editions. DC published a line called Showcase Presents, but was replaced with a line of hardcover editions called "Golden Age Omnibus", "Silver Age Omnibus" and "Bronze Age Omnibus", along with many Modern Age Omnibus titles.
 The Lord of the Rings has been sold in an omnibus containing all three volumes and 6 appendices.
 The Chronicles of Narnia have been sold in an omnibus edition containing all seven novels in the series.
 The Three Californias Trilogy by Kim Stanley Robinson has been published in a single-volume edition by Tor Books.
 The three novels comprising Joe Haldeman's The Forever War series have been published in a single volume titled "Peace and War" by Gollancz S.F.

See also
 Anthology
 Box set
 Trade paperback (comics)
 Short story collection

Book series
Volume (bibliography)
Collection (publishing)

References

Novel forms
Literary terminology